Brock Miron (born 9 July 1980) is a Canadian speed skater. He competed in the men's 500 metres event at the 2006 Winter Olympics.

References

External links
 

1980 births
Living people
Canadian male speed skaters
Olympic speed skaters of Canada
Speed skaters at the 2006 Winter Olympics
Sportspeople from Brockville
21st-century Canadian people